Great Russian chauvinism is a term defined by the early Soviet government officials, most notably Vladimir Lenin to describe an ideology of the "dominant exploiting classes of the nation, holding a dominant (sovereign) position in the state, declaring their nation as the "superior" nation". Lenin promoted an idea for the Bolshevik party to defend the right of oppressed nations within the former Russian Empire to self-determination and equality as well as the language-rights movement of the newly-formed republics.

Definition 
According to Bolshevik vocabulary, the Great-Russian chauvinism is a part of more common Great-Power chauvinism or chauvinism in general. As the Great Soviet Encyclopedia (GSE) says, Great-Power chauvinism is an ideology of the "dominant exploiting classes of the nation, holding a dominant (sovereign) position in the state, declaring their nation as the "superior" nation". The GSE defines chauvinism as an extreme form of nationalism and acknowledges the existence of great-national chauvinism in the Russian Empire as well as other countries across the globe.

Usage of the word "Great" there traces back to the triune nation concept which was dominating during the imperial era. Modern Russians were referred to as "Great Russians", while Ukrainians were named "Lesser Russians", resembling traditional historical and geographical division of the country's core (compare Greater and Lesser Poland).

Usage 
Following the October Revolution, in September, 1922 Lenin wrote a letter to the Politburo stating, "we consider ourselves, the Ukrainian SSR, and others equal and enter with them on an equal basis into a new union, a new federation, the Union of the Soviet Republics of Europe and Asia". Lenin also promoted an idea for the Bolshevik party to defend the right of oppressed nations within the former Russian Empire to self-determination and equality as well as the language-rights movement of the newly-formed republics.

Moreover, in December 1922 Lenin in his letter "What practical measures must be taken in the present situation?" wrote, "...Thirdly, exemplary punishment must be inflicted on Comrade Ordzhonikidze (I say this all the more regretfully as I am one of his personal friends and have worked with him abroad) and the investigation of all the material which Dzerzhinsky's commission has collected must be completed or started over again to correct the enormous mass of wrongs and biased judgments which it doubtlessly contains. The political responsibility for all this truly Great-Russian nationalist campaign must, of course, be laid on Stalin and Dzerzhinsky."

At the 12th Congress of the RCP(b) Nikolay Bukharin stated: “We, [ethnic Russians] as a former great-power nation, must put ourselves in an unequal position. Only with such a policy, when we artificially put ourselves in a position lower than others, only at this price can we buy the trust of formerly oppressed nations."

In all of Stalin's speeches on the national question at party congresses (from the 10th to the 16th), the Great-Russian chauvinism was declared the main danger to the Soviet state. But over time, yielding to the requirements of the newly created super-centralized structures of the Union government, the thesis was forgotten and the indigenous languages were relegated to the background, while Russian became the single language of office.

Russian president Vladimir Putin, speaking on 18 June 2004 at the international conference "Eurasian Integration: Trends of Modern Development and Challenges of Globalization", said about the problems hindering integration: "I would say that these problems can be formulated very simply. This is great-power chauvinism, this is nationalism, this is the personal ambitions of those on whom political decisions depend, and, finally, this is just stupidity, ordinary cavemen's stupidity".

See also 
Korenizatsiya
National delimitation in the Soviet Union
Bourgeois nationalism
Soviet patriotism

References

External links 
 Great-Power chauvinism at the Great Soviet Encyclopedia
 Chauvinism at the Great Soviet Encyclopedia
 Vladimir Lenin. On the National Pride of the Great Russians. Marxists.org.

Chauvinism
Russian nationalism
Soviet phraseology